Beffes is a commune in the Cher department in the Centre-Val de Loire region of France.

Geography
The canal latéral à la Loire flows through the centre of the commune.

Population

Places of interest
 The church of St.Catherine, dating from the nineteenth century.
 The chateau, dating from the fifteenth century.
 Vestiges of Roman occupation.
 A feudal motte at LeFort.
 A restored washhouse.

See also
Communes of the Cher department

References

External links

Official website of Beffes 

Communes of Cher (department)